Petri Mattila (born January 11, 1970) is a Finnish ice hockey coach. He is currently the head coach of Asiago Hockey 1935.

In September 2010, three week before the start of the 2010–11 SM-liiga season, Mattila resigned as head coach of Tappara citing “personal reasons”.

Awards and honours

References

External links
Petri Mattila's profile at Eliteprospects.com

1970 births
Living people
Finnish ice hockey coaches
Ice hockey people from Tampere